The Palestinian Preventive Security (PPS) (Arabic: الأمن الوقائي; Al-'amn al-wiqa'i), also known as Preventive Security Force (PSF), Preventive Security Service (PSS) is one of the security organs of the State of Palestine. It was established in 1994 by president Yasser Arafat in accordance with the Oslo Accords.

The PPS is an internal intelligence organization, part of the Palestinian Security Services, and led by the Minister of the Interior. Its main tasks are protecting the internal security of Palestine and the Palestinian Authority, and preventing crimes which target governmental departments and public bodies and institutions. It was the keeper of the Oslo peace process.

Organization

The PPS is one of several intelligence services of Palestine. According to some sources, 5,000 plain-clothed members served in separate units in the West Bank and Gaza in 2006.

The PPS has long been one of the most powerful intelligence organizations, mainly to protect the Oslo peace process. In the late 1990s the "Security and Protection Department" or so-called "Death Sqad" was established, aimed at activists of Hamas and Islamic Jihad. In 2007, the estimated strength was 3,500 in the West Bank and 4,500 in Gaza.

2007 reform 

In November 2007, President Mahmoud Abba issued "Decree Law No. of 2007 Concerning the Preventive Security", which re-defined the Preventive Security. The Law is not approved by the Palestinian Legislative Council.

The Preventive Security is led by the Minister of the Interior and headed by the Director-General of the Directorate-General of the Preventive Security. According to the 2007 Law, the duties of the Preventive Security are:

 Working to protect the Palestinian internal security.
 Following up on crimes which threaten the internal security of the National Authority and/or those imposed thereon, as well as working towards their prevention.
 Uncovering crimes which target governmental departments and public bodies and institutions, as well as the employees thereat.

Leadership 

Jibril Rajoub headed the West Bank Force until July 2002. Mohammed Dahlan, was the first chief of the Palestinian Security Force in Gaza from 1994 to 2002. Dahlan was replaced by Rashid Abu Shbak. In April 2005, Rashid Abu Shbak became head of the PSF in both West Bank and Gaza. In February 2006, he was appointed head of the new Palestinian Security Services, which included the PSF.

Majid Faraj 

 joined the PSF from 1994, when the Preventive Force was established, and headed by Jibril Rajoub. In 2000, he was in charge of the Bethlehem district. In 2006, Faraj was promoted to the head of military intelligence in the West Bank. Abbas appointed him chief of the General Intelligence Service in 2009.

Developments

Second Intifada
The PPS was accused by Israel of playing a covert role in the Second Intifada that erupted in September 2000 after Ariel Sharon's visit to the Temple Mount. In 2001, it shelled the house of General Jibril Rajoub, then colonel, who at the time was the PPS director. A number of PPS officers were also assassinated, injured and arrested. In April 2002, Sharon ordered the Operation Defensive Shield, the largest Israeli military campaign in the West Bank since its occupation in 1967. The headquarters of PPS in Beitunia was placed under a military siege, with intensive shelling by tanks and Apaches, reducing the headquarters to rubble, and injuring dozens of officers.

2007
On 14 June 2007, Hamas militants took over the Preventive Security building in Gaza City and the intelligence service headquarters in Gaza.

See also
 Palestinian Civil Defence
 Palestinian Security Services
 Palestinian National Security Forces
 Palestinian Civil Police Force

References

External links
Preventive Security Service Graduation Ceremony, 19 May 1996
Marsad — The Palestinian Security Sector Observatory

Law enforcement in the State of Palestine
Palestinian Security Services